New Cross Hospital was a hospital in the New Cross district of south east London, open from 1877 until around 1991.

History
The hospital was opened by the Metropolitan Asylums Board (MAB) on 17 March 1877 as Deptford Hospital. Its purpose at that time was as a fever hospital treating patients suffering from smallpox, of which there was an epidemic at the time. It was one five fever hospitals - the others were in Fulham, Hampstead (site now occupied by the Royal Free Hospital), Homerton (site of Homerton University Hospital) and Stockwell (now Lambeth Hospital) - forming a ring around central London, and shared the same architects as the Fulham hospital (J Walker and W Crickman).

In 1885, its name was changed to the South Eastern Fever Hospital. The hospital was expanded between 1902 and 1906. It was transferred from the MAB to control by London County Council in 1930 and continued to be a fever hospital until 1941.

It was given the name New Cross General Hospital around 1949, soon after the creation of the National Health Service (NHS), and after the NHS closed it for a time it re-opened in 1952 as a satellite for Guy's Hospital. By 1982, it comprised 269 beds and was mainly used by geriatric patients. It closed as a hospital around 1991, but southern parts of the site to the north of Wardalls Grove remained in NHS use until at least 2004.

Notable people 
Notable people connected with the hospital included:
James Niven, physician at the hospital

References 
Notes

Citations

Hospitals established in 1877
1877 establishments in England
Hospitals disestablished in 1991
1991 disestablishments in England
New Cross
Defunct hospitals in London
Fever hospitals